William Eckhardt may refer to:

 William Eckhardt (lawyer), lawyer and professor of law
 William Eckhardt (trader) (born 1955), commodities and futures trader and fund manager